Xavier Pinoteau (born 12 February 1983) is a French former professional footballer who played as a goalkeeper.

Career
Pinoteau spent his most of his career in the lower leagues of France, and signed a professional contract with Chambly on 11 June 2016. He made his professional-level debut with the club in a 2–1 Ligue 2 loss to Paris FC on 7 February 2020, a couple days shy of his 37th birthday.

In a match against Caen on 30 January 2021, Pinoteau took a blow to the head and was sent to the hospital. According to the club, he was doing better and had regained consciousness. Coincidentally, in the same match, Caen's goalkeeper Garissone Innocent was also rushed to the hospital after suffering a tachycardia attack and collapsing on the field.

In 2022, at the age of 39, Pinoteau announced his retirement from football.

References

External links

Foot National Profile

1983 births
Living people
Sportspeople from Saint-Denis, Seine-Saint-Denis
Association football goalkeepers
French footballers
AS Beauvais Oise players
Gazélec Ajaccio players
Villemomble Sports players
Red Star F.C. players
FC Saint-Louis Neuweg players
Entente SSG players
FC Chambly Oise players
Championnat National players
Championnat National 2 players
Championnat National 3 players
Ligue 2 players
Footballers from Seine-Saint-Denis